Nazism in Brazil began even before World War II, when the National Socialist German Workers' Party made political propaganda in the country to attract militants among the members of the German community. Germans began emigrating to Brazil around 1824. In the 1920s and 1930s another major wave of German immigrants began arriving in Brazil again in the tens of thousands due to the socioeconomic problems faced by Weimar Republic Germany in post World War I.
It was this new wave of German immigration that originated most of the Nazis in Brazil, since these new immigrants had stronger ties with Germany than the immigrants who arrived in Brazil in the 19th century.

It can not be said if the majority of the German community in Brazil adhered to the Nazi ideology, but important segments of this community were infiltrated by Nazis. The Nazis in Brazil were concentrated mainly between the business and urban strata of the German community, and not in the German colonies. Not all affiliates to the Nazi party in Brazil engaged in  ideology; many did so in pursuit of economic benefits that such membership could provide.

In 1939, 87,024 German immigrants lived in Brazil, of which 33,397 were in São Paulo, 15,279 in Rio Grande do Sul, 12,343 in Paraná and 11,293 in Santa Catarina. Of the total number of Germans, only 2,822 were affiliated with the Nazi party, less than 5% of the German community. The Nazis were spread across 17 Brazilian states, from north to south. The largest number of Nazis was in São Paulo (785), followed by Santa Catarina (528) and Rio de Janeiro (447). At that time, there were also 900,000 Brazilians—descendants of Germans, but these could not join the party; that was reserved to those born German.

It was not in the interest of the Nazis to participate in the elections in Brazil, and the party was never registered in the Brazilian Supreme Electoral Court. According to the then German ambassador to Brazil, Karl Ritter, there were explicit guidelines that the party should not interfere in Brazil's internal affairs. The party operated in Brazil from 1928 to 1938, without being interfered with by the Brazilian government, then led by Getúlio Vargas. In the last year, 1938, after the establishment of the Estado Novo dictatorship, the Nazi party and all other foreign political associations were declared illegal.

Nazi propaganda in Brazil 

In 1928, the Brazilian section of the Nazi Party was founded in Timbó, Santa Catarina. Approximately a hundred thousand born Germans and one million descendants lived in Brazil at that time. Most of those lived in isolated communities in southern Brazil that preserved the German language and culture. With Adolf Hitler's rise to the Chancellor's office in Germany, German-Brazilians began to be sent propaganda from German Nazism to attract followers abroad.

Although there has never been a Nazi Party organized, legally or clandestinely in the country, several members of the Teuto-Brazilian community were members of the Brazilian section of the Nazi Party of Germany. This section reached 2,822 members and was the largest section of the German Nazi Party outside Germany. As it was a foreign organization, only born Germans could be affiliated; and the Brazilian descendants of Germans, who might want to, could act only as sympathizers.

It is estimated that about 5% of the German-born immigrants then residing in Brazil were, at one time, associated with the German Nazi Party. These Nazis resided in 17 Brazilian states, most of them in São Paulo, mainly in Santo André. However, the overwhelming majority of German-Brazilians were not seduced by propaganda and never joined Nazism.

German community in Brazil 

Before 1930, there were two flows of German immigration into Brazil. The first flow occurred in the nineteenth century, which gave rise to several colonies scattered throughout Brazil, but concentrated in the South. At the time of the rise of Nazism in Germany, this community was already largely made up of the second and third generation in Brazil. This community maintained diverse German cultural habits, however the geographic distance and the passage of time brought about perceptible cultural changes. In turn, the second flow occurred in the first decades of the twentieth century. During the Republic of Weimar and due to the consequences of World War I, Germany experienced several economic crises. At the same time, Brazil was experiencing industrial development, especially in São Paulo and Rio de Janeiro. Due to the demand for skilled and technical labour, many Germans immigrated to Brazil during this period.  Evidently, these new immigrants had stronger and more recent bonds with Germany than the German-Brazilians who arrived in the 19th century, and their descendants.

The newly arrived immigrants from Germany differed from the existing German-Brazilians. The first were called Reichsdeutsche (Germans of the Empire), while the second were the Volksdeutsche (German people). Only the German-born could join the Nazi party. That is why the largest number of Nazis in Brazil lived in São Paulo, since the state was the preferred destination of the second wave of German immigration.

By the mid-1930s, there were more than one million Germans and their descendants in Brazil, mostly in Rio Grande do Sul (600,000) and Santa Catarina (220,000). In 1940, Germans and descendants made up 22.34% of the population of Santa Catarina and 19.3% in Rio Grande do Sul. The German community in the country preserved its culture and language, understood as a manifestation of Germanism, which was possible through the existence of societies, a German-language press, and especially schools. The 1940 census showed that 640,000 people used German as their primary home language in Brazil. Based on the high proportion of members of the German community who used German at home (more than 70%), it was concluded that there was a low level of cultural assimilation of this community.

Adherence to nazism

Consequences of Estado Novo nationalism 

The government of the Estado Novo promoted the forced integration of the Germans and their descendents that lived in isolated communities in the south of Brazil. On several occasions the government acted with brutality against ordinary immigrants who had no relationship with Nazi Germany.

In 1940, on a visit to Blumenau, city of German colonization in the state of Santa Catarina, Vargas declared: "O Brasil não é inglês nem alemão. É um país soberano, que faz respeitar as suas leis e defende os seus interesses. O Brasil é brasileiro. (...) Porém, ser brasileiro, não é somente respeitar as leis do Brasil e acatar as autoridades. Ser brasileiro é amar o Brasil. É possuir o sentimento que permite dizer: o Brasil nos deu pão; nós lhe daremos o sangue". (Brazil is not English nor German. It is a sovereign country, that ensures respect to its laws and defends its interests. The Brazil is Brazilian. (...) However, being Brazilian isn't just to respect the laws of Brazil and to respect the authorities. To be Brazilian is to love Brazil. It is to possess the feeling that allows one to say: Brazil gave us bread; we will give it our blood".)

The Japanese immigrants and Italians were also persecuted and forced to "Braziliate". The case of the Teuto-Brazilians is unique because they formed isolated communities that maintained the traditions and used exclusively the German language.

Nazis in Brazil after the war 
After Germany's defeat in World War II, many Nazis who were sought by the Allies as suspected war criminals fled to Brazil and hid among the German-Brazilian communities. The most famous case was Josef Mengele, a doctor who became known as the "Angel of Death" at the Auschwitz concentration camp. Mengele performed medical experiments with living humans, always without anaesthesia, for the purpose of researching the perfection of the Aryan race. A good part of the victims of their "scientific experiments" were dwarfs and twins.  Mengele lived hidden in the interior of São Paulo state from 1970 to 1979, when he drowned in Bertioga, on the coast of São Paulo state, without ever having been recognized.

Neo-Nazism in Brazil 

Currently in Brazil there are some neo-Nazi groups in action. However, there is often an association between these groups and the descendants of Southern Germans. Historian Rafael Athaides asserts there is no justification for making such a connection. Athaides finds it unlikely that there will be any connection, since a survey of the profiles of the individuals arrested for neo-Nazism shows that none of them are descendants of historical Nazis. These are typically young people who are misfits, "devoid of referential identity and who manipulate the signs of Nazism in the world." To hold the descendants of southern Germans for the support of separatist and neo-Nazi groups happens even when practices described as "neo-Nazi" are practised by caboclos from the interior of Pará. This type of stereotype is criticized in the work of the historian René Gertz.

Some crimes committed by neo-Nazis have caught the attention of the Brazilian press. In 2003, for example, a group of neo-Nazi skinheads forced two young punks to jump off a moving train in Mogi das Cruzes. One of them died and the other lost an arm. In São Paulo, the resurgence of the Nazi movement had its origins in the 1980s, when the "Carecas do ABC" emerged, an extreme right-wing group opposed to the trade union movement led by Luiz Inácio Lula da Silva, who emerged in the same region. Since then, communication over the internet has broadened the boundaries of the movement. The site Valhala88, deactivated in 2007, received 200 thousand visits daily by users of the country.

According to the anthropologist Adriana Dias, from Unicamp, a scholar of the question of neo-Nazism in Brazil, the heated debate in the 2010 presidential election breathed the movement. For her, "the issue of prejudice against the Northeastern Brazilians [...] comes from the elections of Lula. In Dilma's election, this was feeling was radicalized because of the issue of abortion and same-sex marriage." According to Adriana, there are two large age groups of neo-Nazis in Brazil. The first one is between 18 and 25 years old and the second is between 35 and 45 years old and the leaders of the first group. According to her, the reading of the neo-Nazis is composed of writings of William Patch, Thomas Haden and Miguel Serrano. Currently, the region with the largest number of neo-Nazi sympathizers is the South, with more than 105,000; Internet users who download more than 100 files from neo-Nazi websites are considered sympathizers.

From 2015 to 2021, the number of Nazi cells in Brazil grew from 75 to 530. The number of Federal Police inquiries on apology for Nazism jumped to 110 in 2020, after remaining below 22 each year from 2010 to 2018. In November 2022, the Prosecutor General of the Republic expressed concern over the increase in the number of these groups in Santa Catarina.

See also 
Deutscher Morgen
German Brazilians
Brazil–Germany relations

References 

Fascism in Brazil
German-Brazilian culture
Brazil
Nazi propaganda organizations
Nazis in South America